Eden Brent (born November 16, 1965 in Greenville, Mississippi, United States) is an American musician on the independent Yellow Dog Records label. A blues pianist and vocalist, she combines boogie-woogie with elements of blues, jazz, soul, gospel and pop. Her vocal style has been compared to Bessie Smith, Memphis Minnie and Aretha Franklin. She took lessons from Abie "Boogaloo" Ames, a traditional blues and boogie woogie piano player and eventually earned the nickname "Little Boogaloo."

In 2006, she won the Blues Foundation's International Blues Challenge. Along with other awards, Brent garnered two 2009 Blues Music Awards - one for Acoustic Artist of the Year, the other for Acoustic Album of the Year (Mississippi Number One). At The 14th Annual Independent Music Awards in 2015, Eden Brent won the award in the "Holiday Song" category for "Valentine".

History
Eden Brent was born in 1965 and raised in Greenville, Mississippi, where she attended Washington School.<https://www.mswritersandmusicians.com/mississippi-musicians/eden-brent> Brent studied jazz and music at the University of North Texas, graduating with a Bachelor's degree in Music.

When she was 16, Eden Brent met the late blues pioneer, Abie Ames, and began to teach herself how to play his style. Brent has said, 
"By the time I was 19, I’d nearly become sort of a groupie. I’d go hear him and request certain songs because I wanted to hear them and sort of watch over his shoulder a bit and watch the way he was playing. Sometimes I’d request the same thing over and over and then go home and try to learn it. Finally, after a few failures of not being able to pick it up on my own I was bold enough to ask him to teach me."In 1985, Ames took her under his wing for 16 years, nicknaming her Little Boogaloo. This apprenticeship advanced Brent’s talents. She was featured alongside Ames in the 1999 PBS documentary, Boogaloo & Eden: Sustaining the Sound, and in the 2002 South African production Forty Days in the Delta.

Brent has appeared around the country at venues and events such as the Kennedy Center, the 2000 Republican National Convention, the 2005 presidential inauguration (sharing the bill with B.B. King), the Waldorf-Astoria Hotel, the British Embassy, Portland’s Waterfront Blues Festival, the Edmonton Blues Festival, the annual B.B. King Homecoming, and aboard the Legendary Rhythm & Blues Cruise.

Awards
Won
2009: "Acoustic Artist of The Year" by the Blues Foundation
2009: "Acoustic Album of Year" by the Blues Foundation
2010: "Pinetop Perkins Piano Player of The Year" by the Blues Foundation
2015: "Holiday Song" award for "Valentine" -  2015 14th Annual Independent Music Awards

Nominated
 2008: "Sean Costello Rising Star Award" by the Blues Blast Music Awards
 2008: "Blues Song Of The Year" by the Blues Critic Awards Reader's Poll for "Mississippi Number 1"
 2009: "Blues Album of the Year" by the Just Plain Folks Music Awards for "Mississippi Number 1"
 2009: "Blues Song of the Year" by the Just Plain Folks Music Awards for "Until I Die"
 2009: "Best New Artist Debut" by the Blues Foundation for Mississippi Number 1
 2009: "Pinetop Perkins Piano Player of the Year" by the Blues Foundation
 2009: "Blues Song Of The Year" finalist at the 8th Annual Independent Music Awards for "Mississippi Flatland Blues"
 2009: "Blues Artist of The Year" by the Living Blues Awards
 2009: "Best New Artist Debut Recording" by the Blues Blast Music Awards
 2009: "Best Female Artist" by the Blues Blast Music Awards
 2009: "Sean Costello Rising Star Award" by the Blues Blast Music Awards
 2010: "Most Outstanding Musician – Keyboard" by the Living Blues Awards
2011: "Blues Album, Adult Contemporary Song" for The Independent Music Awards

Discography
2003: Something Cool (Little Boogaloo Records)
2008: Mississippi Number One (Yellow Dog Records)
2010: Ain't Got No Troubles (Yellow Dog Records)
2014: Jigsaw Heart  (Yellow Dog Records)
2018: An Eden Brent Christmas (with Bob Dowell) (Yellow Dog Records)

References

External links
 Official Eden Brent website
 Yellow Dog Records website

Blues musicians from Mississippi
American blues singers
American blues pianists
Boogie-woogie pianists
Musicians from Greenville, Mississippi
Singers from Mississippi
Living people
1965 births
University of North Texas College of Music alumni
20th-century American pianists
21st-century American pianists
21st-century American women pianists
20th-century American women musicians
20th-century American musicians